Papaarangi Mary-Jane Reid (born 1954) is a New Zealand public health academic and, is a full professor at the University of Auckland.

Academic career
After medical degrees at the University of Auckland, Reid joined, rising to full professor.

In 2007 Reid won the Public Health Association's Tū Rangatira mō te Ora award.

Reid is one of the founders and co-leaders of Te Rōpū Whakakaupapa Urutā, the National Māori Pandemic Group, set up in March 2020 in response to the COVID-19 pandemic in New Zealand.

Selected works 
 Reid, Papaarangi, and Bridget Robson. "Understanding health inequities." Hauora: Māori Standards of Health IV. A study of the years 2005 (2000): 3–10.
 Merry, Alan F., Craig S. Webster, Jacqueline Hannam, Simon J. Mitchell, Robert Henderson, Papaarangi Reid, Kylie-Ellen Edwards et al. "Multimodal system designed to reduce errors in recording and administration of drugs in anaesthesia: prospective randomised clinical evaluation." Bmj 343 (2011): d5543.
 Gander, Philippa H., Nathaniel S. Marshall, Ricci Harris, and Papaarangi Reid. "The Epworth Sleepiness Scale: influence of age, ethnicity, and socioeconomic deprivation. Epworth Sleepiness scores of adults in New Zealand." Sleep 28, no. 2 (2005): 249–254.
 Paine, Sarah-Jane, Philippa H. Gander, Ricci Harris, and Papaarangi Reid. "Who reports insomnia? Relationships with age, sex, ethnicity, and socioeconomic deprivation." Sleep 27, no. 6 (2004): 1163–1169.
 Duncanson, Mavis, Alistair Woodward, and Papaarangi Reid. "Socioeconomic deprivation and fatal unintentional domestic fire incidents in New Zealand 1993–1998." Fire Safety Journal 37, no. 2 (2002): 165–179.

Personal life
Reid is of the Te Rarawa iwi.

References

External links
 

Living people
1954 births
New Zealand women academics
University of Auckland alumni
Academic staff of the University of Auckland
Te Rarawa people
New Zealand Māori academics
New Zealand medical researchers
New Zealand Māori medical doctors
New Zealand Māori women academics